Claudia Elena Aguila Torres (born 29 October 1972) is a Mexican politician affiliated with the PRD. She currently serves as Deputy of the LXII Legislature of the Mexican Congress representing the Federal District.

References

1972 births
Living people
Politicians from Mexico City
Members of the Chamber of Deputies (Mexico) for Mexico City
Party of the Democratic Revolution politicians
21st-century Mexican politicians
21st-century Mexican women politicians
Members of the Congress of Mexico City
National Autonomous University of Mexico alumni
Deputies of the LXII Legislature of Mexico
Women members of the Chamber of Deputies (Mexico)